The 2020–21 season was the seventh consecutive season in the top flight of Scottish football played by Hamilton Academical, following their promotion to the division at the end of the 2013–14 season. Hamilton also competed in the League Cup and the Scottish Cup.

Summary

Season

Results and fixtures

Pre-season

Scottish Premiership

Scottish League Cup

Group stage

Scottish Cup

Squad statistics

Appearances
As of 16 May 2021

|-
|colspan="10"|Players who left the club during the 2018–19 season
|-

|}

Team statistics

League table

Results by round

League Cup table

Transfers

Transfers in

Loans in

Transfers out

Notes

Footnotes

References

Hamilton Academical F.C. seasons
Hamilton Academical